Jasna Atanasijević (born 1979) is a Serbian economist known primarily as an Assistant professor at Department of Mathematics and Informatics of the Faculty of Sciences, University of Novi Sad. She also serves as a director of Public Policy Secretariat of the Republic of Serbia. Since 2015, she has been an member of the Serbian Association of Economists.

Early life and education
Jasna was born in 1979 in Belgrade, Serbia. She was graduated from University of Belgrade in Economics. In 2003, she obtained her Master degree in Finance from Toulouse 1 Capitole University. In 2013, she completed her Ph.D. in Economics from Paris-Sorbonne University.

Career
Jasna worked as a Chief economist at Hypo Alpe Adria Bank in 2009. Before that she served as a researcher in a Serbian think tank named CEVES (Center for advanced economic studies) and FREN (Foundation for Development of Economic Science).

In 2014, she became a Director at the Public policy secretariat of the Government of Serbia. Jasna also worked as a coordinator of Erasmus+ for higher education sector including role in policymaking and policy analysis at three largest universities in Serbia. She also served as a researched for the World Bank project on "Competitiveness and Jobs".

References

1979 births
Living people
21st-century Serbian economists
Academic staff of the University of Novi Sad
University of Belgrade alumni
University of Toulouse alumni
Paris-Sorbonne University alumni